Beautiful Creatures is a 2000 British crime film directed by Bill Eagles and starring Susan Lynch and Rachel Weisz. Lynch received a British Independent Film Award nomination for her role.

Plot
Two women with bad taste in men are thrown together when one accidentally kills the other's boyfriend when attempting to stop a public beating. They attempt to rob the dead man's wealthy brother with a ransom scam, but when a corrupt detective gets involved things go awry.

Cast
 Rachel Weisz as Petula
 Susan Lynch as Dorothy
 Iain Glen as Tony
 Tom Mannion as Brian McMinn
 Maurice Roëves as Ronnie McMinn
 Alex Norton as Detective Inspector Hepburn
 Jake D'Arcy as Train Guard
 Juliet Cadzow as Mother on Beach

Reception
On Rotten Tomatoes the film has an approval rating of 38% based on reviews from 60 critics. On Metacritic it has a score of 40% based on reviews from 22 critics, indicating "mixed or average reviews".

Roger Ebert of the Chicago Sun-Times gave the film 1.5 out of 4 and wrote: "There is some dark humor in the movie, of the kind where you laugh that you may not gag."

References

External links 
 

2000 films
2000 crime films
2000s English-language films
2000s German-language films
British crime films
DNA Films films
2000 directorial debut films
Films directed by Bill Eagles
2000s British films